Thomas Andrew Currie (born 6 November 1970) is a Scottish former footballer who played as a defender for Clydebank and Dumbarton.

He later played in the Junior grade of Scottish football, winning the West Region Super League in 2003–04 with Kilwinning Rangers.

References

1970 births
Scottish footballers
Dumbarton F.C. players
Clydebank F.C. (1965) players
Kilwinning Rangers F.C. players
Scottish Football League players
Scottish Junior Football Association players
Association football defenders
Footballers from West Dunbartonshire
Living people
People from Alexandria, West Dunbartonshire